Jude Philip Calabrese (born 1971), known professionally as J. Philip Calabrese and Phil Calabrese, is a United States district judge of the United States District Court for the Northern District of Ohio. He formerly served as a judge of the Cuyahoga County Court of Common Pleas.

Education 

Calabrese earned his Bachelor of Arts, summa cum laude, from the College of the Holy Cross and his Juris Doctor, cum laude, from Harvard Law School. He was a Fulbright Fellow at the American School of Classical Studies at Athens.

Career 

Upon graduating law school, Calabrese served as a law clerk to Judge Alice M. Batchelder of the United States Court of Appeals for the Sixth Circuit. He was a partner with Porter, Wright, Morris & Arthur, where he co-chaired the firm's class action practice. Since fall 2017, he has served as an adjunct professor at Case Western Reserve University School of Law.

State court service 

On June 21, 2019, Governor Mike Dewine appointed Calabrese as a Judge of the Cuyahoga County Court of Common Pleas to fill the vacancy left by Judge Pamela Barker's appointment to the United States District Court for the Northern District of Ohio. He was sworn into office on July 3, 2019. His state court service ended in 2020 after he became a federal judge.

Federal judicial service 

On February 26, 2020, President Donald Trump announced his intent to nominate Calabrese to serve as a United States district judge of the United States District Court for the Northern District of Ohio. On March 3, 2020, his nomination was sent to the Senate. President Trump nominated Calabrese to the seat vacated by Judge Christopher A. Boyko, who assumed senior status on January 6, 2020. A hearing on his nomination before the Senate Judiciary Committee was held on July 29, 2020. On September 17, 2020, his nomination was reported out of committee by a 12–10 vote. On December 1, 2020, the United States Senate invoked cloture on his nomination by a 58–35 vote. His nomination was confirmed later that day by a 58–35 vote. He received his judicial commission on December 3, 2020.

Memberships 

He has been a member of the City Club of Cleveland since 2001 and of the Federalist Society since 2005.

References

External links 
 

|-

1971 births
Living people
21st-century American lawyers
21st-century American judges
Case Western Reserve University faculty
College of the Holy Cross alumni
Federalist Society members
Harvard Law School alumni
Judges of the United States District Court for the Northern District of Ohio
Ohio lawyers
Ohio Republicans
Ohio state court judges
People from Evanston, Illinois
United States district court judges appointed by Donald Trump